The Minerals, Metals & Materials Society (TMS) is a professional organization for materials scientists and engineers that encompasses the entire range of materials and engineering, from minerals processing and primary metals production to basic research and the advanced applications of materials.   

The society's functions include providing forums for the exchange of information; encouraging technology transfer; promoting the education and development of professionals and students; representing the profession in the accreditation of educational programs and in the registration of professional engineers (a U.S.-grounded activity); encouraging professionalism, ethical behavior, and concern for the environment; and stimulating a worldwide sense of unity in the profession.

TMS is headquartered in Pittsburgh, United States, but is international in scope. Included among its approximately 13,000 professional and student members are metallurgical and materials engineers, scientists, researchers, educators, and administrators from more than 70 countries on six continents. It uses a volunteer driven structure with members serving at all levels of the society including shaping the policy, programming, and publications of the society.

Technical divisions

The society comprises five technical divisions to program conferences, develop content for publications, and perform other activities:

 Extraction & Processing Division 
 Functional Materials Division 
 Light Metals Division 
 Materials Processing & Manufacturing Division 
 Structural Materials Division

Publications

TMS is a major publisher in the materials community. The society publishes seven internationally respected technical journals, as well as multiple influential roadmapping studies and reports. In addition, each year the society publishes numerous proceedings volumes containing papers presented at society-sponsored meetings.

Journals 
 JOM, a monthly journal devoted to exploring the complete range of minerals, metals, and materials science and engineering.  
 Journal of Electronic Materials, which prints peer-reviewed technical articles each month on advances in electronics materials.
 Metallurgical and Materials Transactions, which comprises two peer-reviewed archival journals. Volume A, published monthly, covers physical metallurgy and materials science, and Volume B, published bi-monthly, covers process metallurgy and materials processing science.
 Journal of Sustainable Metallurgy, a quarterly journal which explores metallurgical processes and related innovations in improving the sustainability of metal-producing industries.
 Integrating Materials and Manufacturing Innovation, which explores innovations in materials which support Integrated Computational Materials Engineering (ICME).

Studies 
TMS has developed influential technology and/or roadmapping studies and reports convening experts in the minerals, metals, and materials communities. These publications are made freely accessible to the public.
 Advanced Materials for Stationary Electrical Energy Storage, which includes a technical roadmap of the highest impact areas of research and development in the field, and the report, "Electric Power Industry Needs for Grid-Scale Storage."
 Linking Transformational Materials and Processing for an Energy-Efficient and Low-Carbon Economy, a three-part study on into areas where new materials and processing breakthroughs can create substantial advancements in carbon emission reduction, energy efficiency, and energy security.
 Implementing Integrated Computational Materials Engineering (ICME) in the Aerospace, Automotive, and Maritime Industries, which compiles the expertise of nearly 50 technical leaders in ICME and its allied fields to offer practical guidance for implementing an ICME-accelerated product development program within three years.
 Diversity in the Minerals, Metals, and Materials Professions (DMMM1), which offers insights into and highlights common themes across issues related to diversity and inclusion in the workplace.
 Modeling Across Scales,  a roadmapping study which offers practical guidance in for connecting materials models across length and time scales.
 Building a Materials Data Infrastructure, which explores the barriers related to data storage and data sharing and offers recommendations to overcoming them.
 Harnessing Materials Innovations to Support Next Generation Manufacturing Technologies, documenting the results of a workshop forecasting key technological breakthroughs supporting the next wave of U.S. manufacturing.
 Advanced Computation and Data in Materials and Manufacturing: Core Knowledge Gaps and Opportunities, which focuses on determining the gaps in core knowledge that, if fulfilled, would enable transformative science and engineering breakthroughs within the materials and manufacturing arenas.
 Verification & Validation of Computational Models Associated with the Mechanics of Materials, which charts a course for widespread adoption of robust V&V among computational modelers and experimentalists in mechanics and materials science and engineering.
 Metamorphic Manufacturing: Shaping the Future of On-Demand Components, which provides insight to jump-start a potentially disruptive technology which combines the incremental deformation of a metalsmith with the precision and control of intelligent machines and robotic systems.
 Creating the Next-Generation Materials Genome Initiative Workforce offers a series of action plans and recommendations that address the education and training goals outlined in the 2014 strategic plan of the Materials Genome Initiative (MGI).
 Accelerating the Broad Implementation of Verification & Validation in Computational Models of the Mechanics of Materials and Structures outlines recommended practices, and provides detailed action plans that are designed to support the progress of verification and validation in the mechanics of materials and structures.

Board of Directors

See also
 Fellows of The Minerals, Metals & Materials Society

References

External links
 The Minerals, Metals & Materials Society Home Page

Materials science organizations
Engineering societies based in the United States
Non-profit organizations based in Pittsburgh